Ronnbergia aciculosa is a species of flowering plant in the family Bromeliaceae, native to Colombia and Ecuador. It was first described in 1904 as Aechmea aciculosa.

References

Bromelioideae
Flora of Ecuador
Flora of Colombia
Plants described in 1904